Squalodelphinidae is a family of primitive platanistoid river dolphins found in marine deposits in the eastern Pacific, western Atlantic, and Europe.

Description
Distinguishing features of Squalodelphinidae include a moderately elongated and tapered rostrum, posterior cheek teeth being single-rooted but retaining accessory denticles, and marked skull asymmetry. Members of the family can be differentiated from the South Asian river dolphin by their shorter rostrum.

References

Prehistoric cetaceans
River dolphins
Prehistoric mammal families